Myerscough is a hamlet and former civil parish on the River Brock,  from Lancaster, now in the parish of Myerscough and Bilsborrow, in the Wyre district, in the county of Lancashire, England. In 2001 it has a population of 1111. Since 1267 the Duchy of Lancaster has had land holdings in Myerscough.

History 
The name "Myerscough" means 'Bog wood', the "myrr" part is pre-7th-century-old Norse for "marsh" and the "skogr" part means a "copse" or "thicket". The surname derives from the hamlet. Myerscough was not recorded in the Domesday Book but the township may have been the lost village of Aschebi. Myerscough was recorded as Mirscho in 1258, Miresco in 1265 and Mirescowe in 1297. It was possibly part of the forest of Amounderness. Myerscough was a township in Lancaster parish. From 1866 Myerscough was a civil parish in its own right until it was merged with Bilsborrow on 1 April 2003 to form "Myerscough and Bilsborrow".

Climate

References 

Hamlets in Lancashire
Former civil parishes in Lancashire
Geography of the Borough of Wyre